Vasily Petrovich Ilyin (8 January 1949 – 21 September 2015) was a Soviet handball player.

Ilyin was born in Lisy Nos settlement, Pargolovsky District, Leningrad Oblast He trained at Burevestnik in Moscow. He was a member of the USSR National Team since 1970 and became the Honoured Master of Sports of the USSR in 1976. In 1972 he was part of the USSR Olympic Team which finished fifth at the 1972 Summer Olympics. He played all six matches and scored eleven goals. Four years later he won the gold medal with the Soviet team at the 1976 Summer Olympics. He played three matches and scored two goals. During his career he played 101 match for the USSR National Team and scored 177 goals.

References

External links
profile

1949 births
2015 deaths
Honoured Masters of Sport of the USSR
Soviet male handball players
Russian male handball players
Burevestnik (sports society) athletes
Handball players at the 1972 Summer Olympics
Handball players at the 1976 Summer Olympics
Olympic handball players of the Soviet Union
Olympic gold medalists for the Soviet Union
Olympic medalists in handball
Medalists at the 1976 Summer Olympics
Sportspeople from Leningrad Oblast